"Shut Up" is the second single released by Kelly Osbourne. It is from her debut album Shut Up. It reached the top 20 of some European charts, but only reached #34 in Australia. It was not as successful as her debut single, a cover of "Papa Don't Preach" by Madonna.

Reportedly, Kelly wrote the song about her brother Jack Osbourne, and his annoyance of her when she was a child.

Tracks
 "Shut Up" (album version)
 "Too Much of You" (album version)
 "Shut Up" (karaoke version)
 "Shut Up" (music video)

Charts

References

2003 songs
Kelly Osbourne songs
Songs written by Kelly Osbourne